July 3 - Eastern Orthodox Church calendar - July 5

All fixed commemorations below are celebrated on July 17 by Old Calendar.

For July 4, Orthodox Churches on the Old Calendar commemorate the Saints listed on June 21.

Saints
 Martyrs Theodotus and Theodota, martyred with St. Hyacinth at Caesarea in Cappadocia (108)
 Hieromartyr Theophilos, by the sword.
 Saint Korilla (Cyrilla).
 Hieromartyrs Innocent and Sabbatius, and 30 others with them, in Sirmium of Pannonia (304)
 Hieromartyr Theodore of Cyrene, Bishop of Cyrene in Libya, and with him Martyrs Cyprilla, Aroa, and Lucia (310)
 Hieromartyr Donatus, Bishop of Libya, and Monk-martyr Hilarion (c. 361-363)
 Venerable Martha, mother of Symeon Stylites the Younger, of the Wonderful Mountain (551)
 Saint Andrew of Crete, Archbishop of Crete, the Jerusalemite (712)
 Saint Asclepias the Wonderworker.
 Venerable Menignos.

Pre-Schism Western saints
 Prophets Hosea and Haggai (6th-4th century BCE)  (see also: October 17, December 4, December 16)
 Saint Namphamon and Companions, of Carthaginian descent, he was martyred with several compatriots at Madaura in Numidia in North Africa and called 'the Archmartyr' (c. 180)
 Saint Jucundian, a martyr in North Africa.
 Saint Laurianus, Archbishop of Seville in Spain, he was martyred in Bourges in France (c. 544)
 Saint Finbar, an Abbot of Innis-Doimhle, in Wexford, Ireland (6th century)
 Saint Bertha of Artois (Bertha of Blangy), a Frankish and Anglo-Saxon Abbess of noble blood (c. 725) 
 Saint Aurelian, a monk and Abbot of Ainay in France, he later became Archbishop of Lyons (895)
 Saint Ulrich of Augsburg and Bavaria (973)
 Saint Hatto, born of a noble Swabian family, he left all his property to the monastery of Ottobeuren in Germany, and became a monk there (985)
 Saint Procopius of Sázava, Abbot of Sázava in Bohemia (1053)  (see also: April 1 - East )

Post-Schism Orthodox saints
 Burial of St. Andrew, Prince of Bogoliubovo (1174)
 Saint Michael Choniates, Metropolitan of Athens (1220)
 Saint Andrew (Rublev), iconographer, of the Spaso-Andronikov Monastery, Moscow (1428)

New martyrs and confessors
 Holy Royal Martyrs of Russia (1918):
 Tsar Nicholas II, 
 Tsaritsa Alexandra, 
 Crown Prince Alexei
 Grand Duchesses Olga, Tatiana, Maria, and Anastasia, and with them: 
 New Martyr Passion bearer Eugene Botkin, physician.
 New Hieromartyr Nilus, Hieromonk, of Poltava (1918)
 New Hieromartyr Jonah (Sankov) the Athonite (1938)  (see also: June 21 )
 New Hieromartyrs Sava (Trlajic), Bishop of Gornji Karlovac (1941) and Đorđe Bogić, Priest, of Nasice (1941)
 New Hieromartyr Demetrius Kazansky, Priest (1942)

Other commemorations
 Icon of the Mother of God of Galatea.
 Translation of the relics (460-490) of St. Martin the Merciful, Bishop of Tours (397)  (see also: October 12, November 11, November 12)
 Uncovering of the relics of St. Euthymius the Wonderworker, Archimandrite, of Suzdal (1507)
 Repose of Hieroschemamonk John, founder of Sarov Monastery (1737)
 Repose of Righteous Confessor Andrew the Russian, at Cairo (c. 1850)
 Slaying of General Dragoljub (Drazha) Mihailovic of Serbia (1946)
 Repose of Archpriest Tikhon Pelikh of Sergiyev Posad (1983)

Icon gallery

Notes

References

Sources
 July 4/July 17. Orthodox Calendar (PRAVOSLAVIE.RU).
 July 17 / July 4. HOLY TRINITY RUSSIAN ORTHODOX CHURCH (A parish of the Patriarchate of Moscow).
 July 4. OCA - The Lives of the Saints.
 July 4. The Year of Our Salvation - Holy Transfiguration Monastery, Brookline, Massachusetts. 
 The Autonomous Orthodox Metropolia of Western Europe and the Americas (ROCOR). St. Hilarion Calendar of Saints for the year of our Lord 2004. St. Hilarion Press (Austin, TX). p. 49.
 The Fourth Day of the Month of July. Orthodoxy in China.
 July 4. Latin Saints of the Orthodox Patriarchate of Rome.
 The Roman Martyrology. Transl. by the Archbishop of Baltimore. Last Edition, According to the Copy Printed at Rome in 1914. Revised Edition, with the Imprimatur of His Eminence Cardinal Gibbons. Baltimore: John Murphy Company, 1916. pp. 194–195.
 Rev. Richard Stanton. A Menology of England and Wales, or, Brief Memorials of the Ancient British and English Saints Arranged According to the Calendar, Together with the Martyrs of the 16th and 17th Centuries. London: Burns & Oates, 1892. pp. 306–309.
Greek Sources
 Great Synaxaristes:  4 ΙΟΥΛΙΟΥ. ΜΕΓΑΣ ΣΥΝΑΞΑΡΙΣΤΗΣ.
  Συναξαριστής. 4 Ιουλίου. ECCLESIA.GR. (H ΕΚΚΛΗΣΙΑ ΤΗΣ ΕΛΛΑΔΟΣ). 
  ΙΟΥΛΙΟΣ. Αποστολική Διακονία της Εκκλησίας της Ελλάδος (Apostoliki Diakonia of the Church of Greece).
  04/07/2018. Ορθόδοξος Συναξαριστής. 
Russian Sources
  17 июля (4 июля). Православная Энциклопедия под редакцией Патриарха Московского и всея Руси Кирилла (электронная версия). (Orthodox Encyclopedia - Pravenc.ru).
  4 июля по старому стилю / 17 июля по новому стилю. Русская Православная Церковь - Православный церковный календарь на 2018 год.
  4 июля (ст.ст.) 17 июля 2014 (нов. ст.). Русская Православная Церковь Отдел внешних церковных связей. (DECR).

July in the Eastern Orthodox calendar